The Panay shrew (Crocidura panayensis) is a species of shrew from the Philippines.

Description

Its dorsal pelage is blackish brown, gradually fading into dusky brown on venter. Its body hairs are fairly uniformly coloured from base to tip. The tail is as dusky-coloured as the body, with the ventral surface being only slightly paler.

Long bristle hairs are present on the proximal half of the tail. The dorsal and part of the ventral surfaces of the fore and hind feet are covered by dark short hairs, with the lateral surfaces slightly darker brown than the inner surfaces. Female have two pairs of inguinal nipples.

References

panayensis
Mammals of the Philippines
Mammals described in 2007
Endemic fauna of the Philippines
Fauna of Panay